Krydder (Norwegian: "Spice") was a men's magazine which was published in Norway.

The magazine was issued by the publisher L. K. Breiens Forlag from 1946 to 1970. The content was jokes and humorous stories combined with soft-core images of naked women.

References

1946 establishments in Norway
1970 disestablishments in Norway
Defunct magazines published in Norway
Magazines established in 1946
Magazines disestablished in 1970
Men's magazines
Norwegian-language magazines